Cardfight!! Vanguard Prime: Shinemon is a 2019 anime television series in the Cardfight!! Vanguard franchise that continues the reboot storyline of the Prime series, roughly based on the Cardfight!! Vanguard manga by Akira Ito. The "Shinemon Arc" is an anime-exclusive storyline based around the events ten years prior to the whole storyline, as well Card Capital's beginnings. Despite the arc being anime-exclusive, it is considered to be the fourth arc of the Cardfight!! Vanguard, and not a new season.

The episodes are first broadcast on TV Tokyo at 8.00am JST Saturday and made available on the website AbemaTV at 9.00pm JST on the same night. The episodes are also uploaded with English subtitles through the official YouTube channel and Crunchyroll. The English dubbed episodes are first broadcast at 9.00pm EST on Friday nights.

Plot
This is the story of "Shinemon Nitta", the future manager of Card Capital.

10 years before the reunion of Aichi Sendou and Toshiki Kai, the card shop run by the Tokura family "Card Capital" was going out of business. Then came the attempt to take over the store by Esuka Hibino, the owner of a major card shop.

In order to protect Card Capital, Shinemon Nitta stands up as the "Self-proclaimed Manager"!

Theme songs

Openings
"Lead the way" by Aina Aiba (VR eps 1–31)
“Legendary" by Roselia (Dubbed VR eps)

Endings
"Gift" by  Argonavis (VR eps 1–19)
"Bokura no turn" by Niji no Conquistador (VR eps 20–31)
“GIFT from THE FIGHT!!" by Tsubasa Yonaga & Takuya Satō (Japanese) Jovette Rivera (English) (Dubbed VR eps)

Episode list

References

Cardfight!! Vanguard
2019 Japanese television seasons